This is a list of climate change books that describe, as a major theme, the effects of human activity on climate change.

Non-fiction
Non-fiction is an account or representation of a subject which is presented as fact. This presentation may be accurate or not; that is, it can give either a true or a false account of the subject in question. However, it is generally assumed that the authors of such accounts believe them to be truthful at the time of their composition.

Fiction

See also
Climate change in literature
List of environmental books

References 

Books on Global Warming, Climate Change Books, Climate Change Education.org

 
Books
Climate change
Climate change
Climate change books